The Sinatra Family Wish You a Merry Christmas is a 1968 Christmas album by Frank Sinatra and featuring his children, Frank Sinatra Jr., Nancy Sinatra and Tina Sinatra.

The album was released on vinyl LP, reel to reel, and 8-track, and was out of print for decades before being re-released on CD in 1999 by Artanis Entertainment Group.

Frank Sr., Nancy and Tina recorded their contributions in the studio together.  Frank Jr. was away on tour, and added his singing later to the pre-recorded tracks. The closing song, "The Twelve Days of Christmas", has different lyrics sung by Sinatra's children honoring their father with their gifts to him, with their father singing the final verse and chorus solo.

Track listing
"I Wouldn't Trade Christmas" (Sammy Cahn, Jimmy Van Heusen)  – 2:55
"It's Such a Lonely Time of Year" (Chip Taylor)  – 4:38
"Some Children See Him" (Whila Hutson, Alfred Burt)  – 2:59
"O Bambino (One Cold and Blessed Winter)" (Remo Capra, Tony Velona)  – 2:59
"The Bells of Christmas (Greensleeves)" (Traditional; arranged by Sammy Cahn and Jimmy Van Heusen)  – 3:41
"Whatever Happened to Christmas?" (Jimmy Webb)  – 3:05
"Santa Claus Is Coming to Town" (John Frederick Coots, Haven Gillespie)  – 2:35
"Kids" (Scott Davis)  – 3:01
"The Christmas Waltz" (Sammy Cahn, Jule Styne)  – 3:12
"The Twelve Days of Christmas" (Traditional; arranged by Sammy Cahn and Jimmy Van Heusen)  – 4:26

Personnel
 Frank Sinatra - Vocals (Tracks 1, 5, 6, 9, 10)
 Frank Sinatra Jr. - Vocals (Tracks 1, 3, 5, 10)
 Nancy Sinatra - Vocals (Tracks 1, 2, 4, 5, 8, 10)
 Tina Sinatra - Vocals (Tracks 1, 4, 5, 7, 10)
 Nelson Riddle - Arranger, Composer
 Don Costa - Arranger, Composer
 The Jimmy Joyce Singers - Vocals

References

Frank Sinatra albums
Nancy Sinatra albums
1968 Christmas albums
Albums arranged by Nelson Riddle
Albums produced by Sonny Burke
Albums arranged by Don Costa
Christmas albums by American artists
Reprise Records albums
Pop Christmas albums